Tom Ball Dunn (born 12 November 1992 in Bath, England) is an English professional rugby union footballer. He plays at hooker for Bath.

In August 2017 Dunn was invited to a training camp with the senior England squad by Eddie Jones. In January 2018 he was named in England's squad for the 2018 Six Nations Championship. He was called up again for the 2020 Six Nations Championship.

On 31 October 2020 he made his England debut from the bench in England's delayed final Six Nations match against Italy, to become the 2020 Six Nations champions.

In January 2023 Dunn was called into the England Six Nations' training squad as an injury replacement.

References

External links

Bath Rugby Profile

1992 births
Living people
English rugby union players
Bath Rugby players
Team Bath rugby union players
England international rugby union players
Rugby union players from Bath, Somerset
Rugby union hookers